The Red Prince: The Secret Lives of a Habsburg Archduke is a 2008 book by Timothy Snyder. It focuses on the life of Wilhelm von Habsburg.

References

2008 non-fiction books
Books about Europe
Biographies (books)